Aralle-Tabulahan is an Austronesian language that belongs to the South Sulawesi subgroup. It is spoken in Mamasa Regency, West Sulawesi, Indonesia.

Aralle-Tabulahan has three dialects: Aralle, Tabulahan and Mambi. The Mambi dialect is the most divergent and takes an intermediate position between the other two dialects and the neighboring Bambam language.

References

Languages of Sulawesi
South Sulawesi languages